Bunkeflo can related to:

Bunkeflo FF, a Swedish football club located in Bunkeflostrand
Bunkeflo IF, a former Swedish football club based in Malmö, Sweden
IF Limhamn Bunkeflo (women), a Swedish women's football club based in Malmö, Sweden
IF Limhamn Bunkeflo (men) a Swedish football club based in Malmö, Sweden
Limhamn-Bunkeflo, a former city district in the west and south of Malmö Municipality, Sweden